Statistics of Úrvalsdeild in the 1952 season.

Overview
It was contested by 5 teams, and KR won the championship. ÍA's Ríkharður Jónsson was the top scorer with 6 goals.

League standings

Results

References

Úrvalsdeild karla (football) seasons
Iceland
Iceland
Urvalsdeild